The diocese of Ifakara (in Latin: Dioecesis Ifakarensis) is a see of the Roman Catholic Church suffragan of the Roman Catholic Archdiocese of Dar-es-Salaam. In 2012, it counted 287,000 baptized people among a population of 322,779 inhabitants. Its current bishop is Salutaris Melchior Libena.

Territory 
The diocese corresponds to the Kilombero District in the Morogoro Region in Tanzania.

Its see is located in the city of Ifakara, where the cathedral of Saint Patrick stands.

The territory is divided into 18 parishes.

History 
The diocese was created on January 14, 2012, by the Papal bull Nuper est petitum of Pope Benedict XVI, taking territories from the Roman Catholic Diocese of Mahenge.

Chronology of the bishops 
Salutaris Melchior Libena, since January 14, 2012

Statistics 
At the date of its creation, the Diocese had a population of 322,779 people among whom 287,800 were baptized, which is 88.9%.

|-
| 2012 || 287.800 || 322.779 || 88,9 || 62 || 42 || 20 || 4.629 || || 3 || 198 || 18
|}

External links 
The diocese on Catholic-hierarchy
Creation of the Diocese
Papal bull Nuper est petitum

Ifakara